Balwyn High School is a state-run high school (years 7–12) in the Melbourne suburb of North Balwyn, in Victoria, Australia. It was established in 1954. As of February 2013, it had 1948 students, making it the fourth largest secondary school in Victoria.

The postwar student population expanded. The school assembly hall was built with assistance from parents and is named after a former principal, Archibald M. Rogers. Managing the large class sizes of the era, the school developed a strong science education at senior levels that saw many of its graduates pass into senior academic, government and private sector positions.

The school buildings were rebuilt in 1994 after merging with Greythorn High School. Since 1996 the school has housed international students in their recently formed international student program.

Academic achievements 

In 2006 the median ENTER (precursor and equivalent to the current ATAR) was 85.70, 40.06% achieved an ENTER at or above 90 and 5.07% achieved an ENTER at or above 99. In 2004, 55 students attained ENTER scores in excess of 97 and the median ENTER was 86.95.

Balwyn High School was ranked fifth out of all state secondary schools in Victoria based on VCE results in 2018.

Extracurricular programmes 

The school runs co-curricular programmes, including music, sport, debating, cheerleading and community programs. Its music programme, which comprises many string orchestras, includes A-Strings (Beginner), Junior Strings (Junior), Intermediate Strings, Newitt Strings (Second Most Advanced) and Senior Strings (Most Advanced), concert bands Training (Beginner), Novice, Junior, Intermediate and Symphony (most advanced), choirs, stage bands, a full symphony orchestra, a smaller chamber orchestra and many other privately formed smaller groups.

Its chess teams have consistently reached state-level competitions, while the school's cheerleading squad, the Skyraiders, earned two gold medals in Pom and Stunt and finished second (Level 2 Cheerleading/Scholastic) at the 2007 National Cheerleading Championships.

Balwyn High School also has a range of student-led clubs that include Social Justice, SRC (Student Representative Council), Chess and Anime.

Sport 

Balwyn High School has a sports faculty, with many interschool sport teams representing the school in numerous sports, some at elite levels, like many other schools around Victoria.

International Students Program
Balwyn High School runs an 'International Students Program'. In 2007, there were 107 international students at Balwyn High School, who pay $11,800 per year, compared with the local students' voluntary school fees of around $900 per year. Balwyn earned 1.2 million from those international students in 2007. Victoria's Education minister Bronwyn Pike denied that it was a "money-making scheme for schools", though Australian Education Union state president Mary Bluett said, "Certainly this has become a financial incentive for schools."

Student services 
Balwyn High School values student's well-being and mental health. A collaborative team operates through the whole school education program including team members of psychologists, counsellors, chaplain, and administrative staffs.

Other 

The school has four houses – Churchill, Strathmore, Windsor and Edinburgh. It also recently introduced a "Safe School Policy" against cyber-bullying. In 2009, the Victorian Budget 2009–2010 has allowed the school to commence "Stage 3" building project which will include art facilities and the replacement of two old blocks. The state government allocated $11.2 million for "school modernisation" of the facilities.

Notable alumni 
 Peter Cullen – water scientist
 Neil J. Gunther – scientist
 Lee Tulloch – Novelist and journalist
 Steve Hooker – pole-vaulter
 Will Hull-Brown – drummer of The Cat Empire
 Michael Theoklitos – Brisbane Roar Goalkeeper, former Norwich City Goalkeeper and Melbourne Victory Goalkeeper
 Lee Simon - Radio Presenter Former top rating DJ at Radio 3XY and EON FM Melbourne
 Malcolm Speed – former CEO of ICC and Australian Cricket Board
 Ernie Merrick - Wellington Phoenix Former Coach of the Melbourne Victory now coach of Wellington
 Connor Downie – Hawthorn Hawks player
 Robert Richter - Australian barrister
 Thomas Sewell - leader of the far-right white nationalist extremist group Lads Society and European Australia Group

References 

Public high schools in Melbourne
Educational institutions established in 1954
1954 establishments in Australia
Buildings and structures in the City of Boroondara